The Brisbane Tramway Museum is an Australian transport museum that has preserved a collection of  trams and trolleybuses most of which operated in Brisbane from 1897 until 1969. The museum is located at Ferny Grove.

History
The Brisbane Tramway Museum Society was established in 1968, when it became apparent that the Brisbane City Council was preparing to close Brisbane's tram system. In 1972, a site at Ferny Grove was made available and a museum built, opening in June 1980.

Collection

As at 10 November 2005, the museum has a collection of 25 trams, 24 of which formerly operated on the Brisbane tram network. The 25th tram in the museum's collection ran in Sydney. The museum also has two single-deck Brisbane trolley-buses built on MF2B chassis by Sunbeam of Wolverhampton, England; fleet numbers 1 (of 1951, with a body by Charles Hope of Brisbane) and 34 (of 1960, body by Athol Hedges). These are on static display.

A number of trams in the museum's collection are operated on a short length of demonstration track 250 metres in length. The oldest operational tram in the museum's collection is No. 47, a "California Combination" or "Matchbox" tram, built in 1901. The newest tram in the collection is No. 554 a "Four Motor" tram built by the Brisbane City Council after the Paddington tram depot fire, and which entered service in 1964. Other operational trams include a 10 bench "Toastrack" tram No. 65, a small centre-aisle or "Baby Dreadnought" tram No. 99, No. 341, a "Dropcentre" tram and another "Four Motor" tram No. 429. A selection of these trams operate each Sunday afternoon, although operations are curtailed in the event of wet weather.

The museum's collection of support vehicles are all former Brisbane City Council Tramways Department vehicles and include a tower wagon used for repairing overhead wires, and a Scammell breakdown recovery truck which was formerly used as an artillery towing truck in World War II.

The museum houses an extensive photographic collection of Brisbane's tramway and street transport heritage, together with tickets and uniforms worn by staff of the tramway operators, a feature of which were the unusual "Foreign legion" caps (more correctly called kepis) worn by drivers and conductors until 1961 and inspectors until more recently.

The museum is also notable for other elements of the former Brisbane system in its collection. The museum's depots (garages) are composed of bays from the former Ipswich Road tram depot. The museum's direct current substation has been built from equipment retrieved from former Brisbane tramway substations. An elevated signal cabin which stood at the corner of Brunswick and Wickham Streets, Fortitude Valley has also been preserved.

The museum's very short section of track has been recovered from Ipswich Road depot, Gregory Terrace and Ipswich Road between Moorooka and Salisbury. In keeping with the practice of the Brisbane City Council Tramways Department, the museum has constructed its track in mass concrete, that is, the track is laid in concrete, rather than on sleepers and ballast. The cost of such mass concrete trackwork being one the reason why the museum has been unable to extend their length of track after numerous efforts. The museum also houses a unique three-way set of points that was originally located at Light Street depot. These points can be found outside the museum's main depot shed.

See also
List of transport museums
Brisbane Transport
Paddington tram depot fire
Trams in Brisbane
Bus transport in Queensland

References

External links

Brisbane Tramway Museum website
 Brisbane's Living Heritage
pictures of preserved Brisbane Trams
Video of preserved Brisbane Trams

Tram transport in Australia
Transport museums in Queensland
Heritage railways in Australia
Bus museums
Tram museums
Trams in Brisbane